Arcos is a genus of clingfishes.

Species
There are currently 6 recognized species in this genus:
 Arcos decoris Briggs, 1969 (Elegant clingfish)
 Arcos erythrops D. S. Jordan & C. H. Gilbert, 1882 (Rockwall clingfish)
 Arcos macrophthalmus Günther, 1861 (Padded clingfish)
 Arcos nudus Linnaeus, 1758 (Clingfish)
 Arcos poecilophthalmos Jenyns, 1842 (Galapagos clingfish)
 Arcos rhodospilus Günther, 1864 (Rock clingfish)

References

Gobiesocidae